Domingo Vásquez (1846–1909) was President of Honduras 7 August 1893 – 22 February 1894.  He lost power as a result of Honduras being defeated in a war with Nicaragua and was replaced by Policarpo Bonilla.

Sources
The Five Central American Republics, p. 123

1846 births
1909 deaths
People from Tegucigalpa
Honduran people of Spanish descent
Presidents of Honduras